Pouilly-sur-Loire is a railway station in Pouilly-sur-Loire, Bourgogne-Franche-Comté, France. The station is located on the Moret-Lyon railway. The station is served by TER (local) services operated by SNCF.

Train services
The following train services serve the station as of 2017:

local service (TER Bourgogne-Franche-Comté) Cosne-sur-Loire - La Charité - Nevers

References

Railway stations in Nièvre